Tomáš Kacovský (born 29 August 1969 in Prague) is a Czech rower. Until 1992, he competed for Czechoslovakia.

References 

1969 births
Living people
Czech male rowers
Rowers from Prague
World Rowing Championships medalists for the Czech Republic